was a Japanese bureaucrat and the Liberal Democratic Party (LDP) politician who served as foreign minister. He was in office from 11 January 1996 to 11 September 1997. Ikeda was known to be "Mr. No" in the political life.

Early life and education
Ikeda was born in Kobe, Hyōgo Prefecture, on 13 May 1937. Following the death of his father in 1944, he moved to Nakajima Honmachi, Hiroshima where his father's family lived. Ikeda studied law at the University of Tokyo and graduated in March 1961.

Career

Ikeda joined the ministry of finance in 1961 and worked as bureaucrat there. Then he became a member of the House of Representatives in 1976 following his membership to the LDP. He won the largest number of votes (55,027) in Hiroshima Prefecture's 2nd electoral district in the 1976 general election. He served as a lawmaker ten times until his retirement. He held key positions in the LDP and was the director general of the Defense Agency. His other posts included chairman of the LDP's decision-making general council and head of the policy research council. He was appointed defense minister on 29 December 1990, replacing Yozo Ishikawa in the post. He served in the post until 5 November 1991 and was succeeded by Sohei Miyashita.

Ikeda's second tenure as foreign minister was from 11 January 1996 to 11 September 1997 in the coalition government headed by Ryutaro Hashimoto. Ikeda replaced Yōhei Kōno as foreign minister. Upon the construction of a wharf facility in Takeshima/Dokdo by the South Korean government at the beginning of 1996, Ikeda protested over the construction and demanded that the South Korean government should stop it. His remarks led to angry public demonstrations in Seoul. He led Japan's attempts to solve the hostage crisis in Peru in the 1990s. Ikeda was replaced by Keizō Obuchi as foreign minister on 11 September 1997.

Later Ikeda became the  policy chief or top policy planner of the LDP in 1998. He was part of Koichi Kato's faction in the LDP.

Personal life and death
Ikeda was son-in-law of former Japanese prime minister Hayato Ikeda. He married Noriko Ikeda in May 1969, and took his wife's family name.

Ikeda died of rectum cancer in Tokyo on 28 January 2004 at age 66.

Honours
From the corresponding article in the Japanese Wikipedia

Senior Third Rank
Grand Cordon of the Order of the Rising Sun

References

External links

|-

|-

|-

|-

|-

|-

20th-century Japanese politicians
1937 births
2004 deaths
Deaths from cancer in Japan
Foreign ministers of Japan
Liberal Democratic Party (Japan) politicians
Japanese defense ministers
Members of the House of Representatives (Japan)
Mukoyōshi
People from Kobe
University of Tokyo alumni